Kimberly Jo Mueller (born September 17, 1957) is the Chief United States district judge of the Sacramento Division of United States District Court for the Eastern District of California. She is the first female district judge to serve in the Eastern District.

Education
Mueller obtained a Bachelor of Arts degree from Pomona College in 1981, and a Juris Doctor from Stanford University in 1995.

Political career
Mueller served as a legislative aide for California State Assembly member Lloyd Connelly. After moving to Sacramento's Tahoe Park neighborhood, Mueller was elected to the Sacramento City Council, where she served from 1987 through 1992.

While on the council, Mueller was selected to serve as Vice-Mayor and chair of the city's budget committee. She also led a successful effort with then-Mayor Anne Rudin to introduce campaign finance reform to the city's politics.

Legal career
Mueller left her position on the Sacramento City Council in 1992 to attend Stanford Law School. After graduation, she worked for five years at the Sacramento office of Orrick, Herrington and Sutcliffe, and later opened her own private practice.

In 2003, Mueller was appointed as a United States magistrate judge of the Sacramento Division of United States District Court for the Eastern District of California, becoming just the second woman to hold this position since the Eastern District was established in 1966.

Mueller currently is an adjunct professor at the University of the Pacific McGeorge School of Law.

Federal judicial service

On March 10, 2010, President Barack Obama nominated Mueller to serve as United States district judge of the United States District Court for the Eastern District of California. Her nomination was unanimously confirmed by the United States Senate on December 16, 2010. Mueller received her commission on December 21, 2010. She became Chief Judge on January 1, 2020.

See also
List of first women lawyers and judges in California

References

External links

1957 births
Living people
People from Newton, Kansas
Judges of the United States District Court for the Eastern District of California
Pomona College alumni
Sacramento City Council members
Stanford Law School alumni
United States district court judges appointed by Barack Obama
21st-century American judges
United States magistrate judges
UC Davis School of Law faculty
University of the Pacific (United States) faculty
Women city councillors in California
American women legal scholars
21st-century American women judges
Orrick, Herrington & Sutcliffe people